Shirley M. Garms (January 18, 1924 – January 25, 2018) was an American tenpin bowler. In consecutive years, 1961 and 1962, she was named woman Bowler of the Year by the Bowling Writers' Association of America. She won the BPAA All-Star championship (later renamed the U.S. Women's Open) in 1962. She was inducted into the United States Bowling Congress Hall of Fame in 1971 and the PWBA Hall of Fame in 1995. She lived in Island Lake, Illinois.

References 

American ten-pin bowling players
American sportswomen
1924 births
2018 deaths
21st-century American women